The White Rabbit is a 1967 British four-part TV series starring Kenneth More. It is based on the book by Bruce Marshall.

Premise
The series is based on the story of Wing Commander F. F. E. Yeo-Thomas who fought for the French Resistance in World War Two. He is captured and tortured by the Gestapo.

Cast
Kenneth More as Wing Cmdr. Forest Frederick Edward “Tommy” Yeo-Thomas
Denise Buckley as Barbara, his girlfriend 
Frank Duncan as Commentator 
Christopher Benjamin as Cadillac 
Stephen Bradley as Ernst 
Robert Bruce as Col. Robinson
David Collings as Horace 
Annette Crosbie as José Dupuis, Yeo-Thomas' resistance contact
George Hagan as Pierre Brossolette
Alan MacNaughtan as Rudi (Gestapo interrogator)
Roy Purcell as Col. Brierley

Episodes
.Absalom (16 Sept 1967, repeated 20 Sept 1967)
.The Raising Up (23 Sept 1967, repeated 27 Sept 1967)
.The Faith (30 Sept 1967, repeated 4 Oct 1967)
.The Beginning (7 Oct 1967, repeated 11 Oct 1967)

Production
Michael Deeley got hold of a feature film script based on the book and managed to get Kenneth More interested. Deeley spoke to John Boulting about it and Boulting got the rights before Deeley could secure them. More loved the script and claimed he spent a year trying to make the film - at one stage they were set to start filming in July 1961 - but they could not clear up the rights. "Shouldn't think it would ever be made now," he said in 1962 

This detail is omitted in More's memoirs. According to those, he read a copy of the book while in Jamaica making Dark of the Sun. He took it to David Attenborough, head of features at the BBC, and suggested it would make an ideal four-part series. Film rights were held by American producer Hal Chester, but the BBC were able to make it provided they never repeated the program or sold it elsewhere. The BBC was willing to do this because More had been in the very successful series The Forsyte Saga.

According to newspaper reports, the BBC announced it was going to film the book with More in September 1966. More called it "a realisation of a dream... I thought the chance had gone forever."

Filming started 27 July 1967.

The series was never sold and had to be destroyed within 28 days of broadcast.

Reception
The Evening Post called it "the best thing ever done by BBC-2."

The Guardian felt it was "too sadistic." The Daily Telegraph thought the character of Yeo Thomas "does not come clearly into focus."

References

External links

1960s British drama television series